Daniyel Cimen (born 19 January 1985 in Hanau) is a German football manager and footballer who plays for SpVgg Groß-Umstadt. He is currently the head coach of FC Gießen.

He was playing for Eintracht Frankfurt, but had some problems earning a spot in the regular squad. Eintracht Frankfurt loaned him to the then 2. Bundesliga side Eintracht Braunschweig. After being relegated with Braunschweig, Cimen joined Frankfurt rival Kickers Offenbach in June 2007. Cimen moved from Kickers Offenbach to FC Erzgebirge Aue in July 2008, but returned to Eintracht Frankfurt in summer 2010.

Managerial career
Cimen was the manager of the U19 team of Eintracht Frankfurt, while he was playing a season for Kreisoberliga Hanau (VIII)-side FC Hanau 93. He was hired in the summer 2012, after leaving the club as a player, and was sacked as manager in the summer 2014 due to bad results.

In the summer 2015, Cimen was hired as the new manager of Rot-Weiss Frankfurt.

Honours

Club 
Eintracht Frankfurt	
 DFB-Pokal Runner-up: 2005–06

References

1985 births
Living people
Sportspeople from Hanau
Footballers from Hesse
German footballers
Eintracht Frankfurt players
Eintracht Frankfurt II players
Eintracht Braunschweig players
Kickers Offenbach players
FC Erzgebirge Aue players
Bundesliga players
2. Bundesliga players
3. Liga players
Germany B international footballers
German people of Assyrian/Syriac descent
Germany youth international footballers
German people of Turkish descent
Association football midfielders